This is a list of post-nominal letters used in the United Kingdom after a person's name in order to indicate their positions, qualifications, memberships, or other status. There are various established orders for giving these, e.g. from the Ministry of Justice, Debrett's and A & C Black's Titles and Forms of Address, which are generally in close agreement; this order is followed in the list.

Baronet or Esquire

Orders and decorations

When listing the honours and awards enjoyed by any person it is not customary to include the Order of St John, as this is a Royal Order of Chivalry and not a State Order, and so confers no precedence. The statutes of the order state (statute 32(2)) The letters specified ... may be used ... but admission or promotion to any Grade of the Order ... shall not confer any rank, style, title, dignity, appellation or social precedence whatsoever.

The Grades of the Order of St John are:

Appointments

University degrees and academic qualifications

These are usually given in ascending order, and may be followed by an abbreviation denoting the awarding Institute. "Hons" or "(Hons)" may be added after bachelor's or integrated master's degrees awarded with honours.

Religious institutes and medical qualifications

Religious institutes
Some examples are given here. See the list of Catholic religious institutes for a fuller listing of current Catholic orders (although note that that article gives American-style post-nominals with stops; when used in the UK the stops should be omitted).

Medical qualifications
According to Debrett's, these are placed directly after orders, decorations and medals (i.e. replacing university degrees). Unlike other degrees, medical qualifications are listed in descending order, doctorates first.

Fellowship or membership of learned societies, academies or professional institutions

These are generally placed in the order learned societies first, then Royal academicians, then professional institutions. There are two schools of thought as to how these should be ordered within each category: A & C Black's Titles and Forms of Address states that "As a general rule, letters should be shown in the order of the foundation of the societies, etc." Contrary to this, Debrett's consider that within learned societies: "There is no recognised order for placing these letters. In practice, where one society is indisputably of greater importance than another the letters are usually placed in that order." Similarly, for professional institutions: "[T]here is no recognised order for placing qualifications awarded by different bodies, a recipient usually places these letters on headed paper, business cards, etc, in order of importance to his particular profession."
There is no clear distinction between a learned society and a professional institute. With regard to Royal Academicians, Debrett's says: "Although Royal Academicians come second in this list, it is not suggested that they yield in precedence to fellows of learned societies. In practice, the two lists do not coincide."

Black's notes that where a professional body or society has multiple grades of membership, only the highest is used except in professional correspondence, and that fellowships "election to which is a distinction" (e.g. FRS, RSA, RA, FBA) should be used on all correspondence, whereas initials only indicating support for a society are limited to correspondence on matters of interest to that society. Initials can also be used in professional contexts to indicate expertise. Debrett's also distinguishes between initials issued as an honour, and those available as a subscription, with only the former normally being used in social correspondence. The former include fellowships of "principal learned societies", including, in order of foundation, FRS, FSA, FRSE, FRSL and FBA.

In this table, all societies, institutions, etc. are listed alphabetically by substantive name, rather than attempting to establish an order of precedence.

Some post-nominals (and associated professional titles) are protected as "Professions Regulated by Professional Bodies Incorporated by Royal Charter" under the European professional qualification directives. These are indicated with an asterisk (e.g. CEng*).

Memberships and fellowships of the various medical Royal Colleges are listed post-nominally as medical qualifications (see the previous section) rather than with professional bodies and learned societies.

Chartered and other professional statuses

Some bodies award Chartered and other professional statuses with separate designatory letters from those indicating membership. These letters are placed before the designatory letters for fellowship or membership of the awarding body, e.g. CPhys MInstP. Where chartered status is a membership level within an institute, this is shown under that institute's entry above, e.g. Chartered Architectural Technologists, MCIAT, or Chartered Tax Advisor, CTA.

Membership of the armed forces and civilian services

In the armed forces, two or more branches may have officers with the same or similar titles, such as "Captain," which is a rank in the Royal Navy, Army and Royal Marines. To differentiate between the branches, post-nominals such as "RN" are used. However, such post-nominals are not used for the higher positions, since the higher officers are differently-titled in each branch.

This is the last set of post-nominals given by the Ministry of Justice and Debrett's; it is not included by Black's.

Professional qualifications

Other awards
Awards other than Crown Honours are not normally listed except in the context of events related to the awarding body

Youth organisations

Notes

References

Post
United Kingdom
Post
Post-nominal